The Butler House in the general area of Pueblo, Colorado was built around 1880, or before. It was listed on the National Register of Historic Places in 1984.

In 1882 it became the ranch of Benjamin F. Butler, "a prominent military figure and attorney from the east."

Other elements of the complex are: an agent's stone house, a stone outbuilding, a barn, and a cow shed.

It is located 26 miles southeast of Pueblo on the Huerfano River, in the plain just after the river comes out of its canyon, in the vicinity of Avondale.

In 2021, the Pueblo County Assessor identifies the owner of 6916 Broadacre as "Bar Nothing Ranches LLC", which had acquired title in 1997 from the Paul Butler Trust.  The property has  total land area, though only  is NRHP-listed.

See also
National Register of Historic Places listings in Pueblo County, Colorado

References

Ranches in Colorado
National Register of Historic Places in Pueblo County, Colorado
Houses completed in 1880